Veliko Selo is a settlement near the Serbian city of Loznica in the Mačva District. It has a population of 446.

Populated places in Mačva District